Hexaphenylbenzene is an aromatic compound composed of a benzene ring substituted with six phenyl rings.  It is a colorless solid.  The compound is the parent member of a wider class of hexaarylbenzenes, which are mainly of theoretical interest.

Preparation
It is prepared by heating tetraphenylcyclopentadienone and diphenylacetylene in benzophenone or other high-temperature solvent. The reaction proceeds via a Diels-Alder reaction to give the hexaphenyldienone, which then eliminates carbon monoxide.

Together with 1,2,3,4-tetraphenylnaphthalene, hexaphenylbenzene forms by the chromium-catalyzed oligomerization of diphenylacetylene.

Structure

The stable conformation of this molecule has the phenyl rings rotated out of the plane of the central benzene ring. The molecule adopts a propeller-like conformation in which the phenyl rings are rotated about 65°, while in the gas phase, they are perpendicular with some slight oscillations.

References

Benzene derivatives
Hydrocarbons
Phenyl compounds